Manhood is a stage in life of a man.

Manhood may also refer to:
 Masculinity, a set attributes, behaviors, and roles typically associated with boys and men
 Manhood (film), a 2003 comedy film
 Manhood (Law & Order), a 1993 episode of Law & Order
 Manhood (album), a 2007 album by stic.man
 Manhood (Muscles album)
 Manhood Peninsula in West Sussex, England
 Manhood Community College
 Manhood (play), a play acted in by William J. Le Moyne in 1882
 Manhood, an 1842 painting in The Voyage of Life series by Thomas Cole

People with the surname
 Harold Alfred Manhood (1904–1991), British author